Hatherton is a civil parish in Cheshire East, England. It contains nine buildings that are recorded in the National Heritage List for England as designated listed buildings. Of these, one is listed at Grade II*, the middle grade, and the others are at Grade II. The parish is almost entirely rural. Apart from a disused bridge, the listed buildings are all domestic properties.

Key

Buildings

See also

Listed buildings in Austerson
Listed buildings in Batherton
Listed buildings in Doddington
Listed buildings in Hankelow
Listed buildings in Hunsterson
Listed buildings in Stapeley
Listed buildings in Walgherton

References
Citations

Sources

 

Listed buildings in the Borough of Cheshire East
Lists of listed buildings in Cheshire